WSOT-LD, virtual and UHF digital channel 27, is a low-powered NRB-affiliated television station licensed to Marion, Indiana, United States. The station is owned by the Sunnycrest Baptist Church.

History
The station began life on December 23, 1990, as W25BN on channel 25. Five years later, the station changes its call sign to the current WSOT-LD, and was added to more local cable systems. In January 1999, a new tower and transmission equipment were purchased for the move from channel 25 to channel 57. On January 30, 2000, the channel switch became official.
In December 2011, the station made its permanent home on digital channel 27 under the direction of current station General Manager, Jason Stepp.

References

External links 
Official site

Grant County, Indiana
Television stations in Marion, Indiana
Low-power television stations in the United States
1990 establishments in Indiana